Brachycoryna is a genus of tortoise beetles and hispines in the family Chrysomelidae. There are seven described species in Brachycoryna.

Species
These seven species belong to the genus Brachycoryna:
 Brachycoryna dolorosa Van Dyke, 1925 i c g b
 Brachycoryna hardyi (Crotch, 1874) i c g b
 Brachycoryna longula Weise, 1907 i c g b
 Brachycoryna melsheimeri (Crotch, 1873) i c g b
 Brachycoryna montana (Horn, 1883) i c g
 Brachycoryna notaticeps Pic, 1928 i c g
 Brachycoryna pumila Guérin-Méneville, 1844 i c g b
Data sources: i = ITIS, c = Catalogue of Life, g = GBIF, b = Bugguide.net

References

Further reading

 
 
 
 
 

Cassidinae
Articles created by Qbugbot